M&Co Trading Limited, previously Mackays Stores Limited until its 2020 administration, (previously trading as Mackays, now trading as M&Co.) is a Scottish chain store selling women's, men's, and children's clothes, as well as small homeware products. Its head office is in Inchinnan, Scotland, though its main buying office is in London. Previously, its head office was at Caledonia House in Paisley.

Established in 1834 as pawnbrokers, Mackays switched to selling clothes in 1953 by brothers Len and Iain McGeoch. In 2005 the company rebranded as M&Co. to reflect a more modern image.
The chain operates over 300 stores and also has an online presence.

History

19th century
In 1834, the McGeoch family founded a pawnbroker business in Paisley, Renfrewshire.

20th century
In 1953, Len and Iain McGeoch began converting their six pawnshops to clothing stores.

In 1970, the company acquired Ghinns Ltd., extending its retail clothing business in the London area.

In 1986, the company acquired Apparel Affiliates Inc., owner of 140 retail clothing stores in the United States.

21st century
In 2005, the company began converting all 270 of its stores to the M&Co. banner.

In March 2012, the first of several international franchise stores opened, beginning with the first of many in Dubai at the Dubai Mall, with further UAE expansion planned.

In June 2020, during the COVID-19 pandemic in the United Kingdom, M&Co was reported to have sought new backers amid a slump in sales. Professional services firm Deloitte supported its hunt for new investors as the company explored sale options including a pre-pack administration.

In December 2022, M&Co went into administration with Teneo Financial Advisory as administrators.

On 6 February 2023, it was announced that M&Co would be closing all 170 stores in the Spring of the same year.

See also 

 Impact of the COVID-19 pandemic on retail

References

External links

 – official site
Mackays (archive)

1834 establishments in Scotland
2023 disestablishments in Scotland
British brands
Clothing retailers of the United Kingdom
Companies based in Paisley, Renfrewshire
Retail companies established in 1834
Retail companies of Scotland
Scottish brands